The Central Railroad of New Jersey Station is a historic railway station located at Wilkes-Barre, Luzerne County, Pennsylvania.  It was built in 1868, by the Central Railroad of New Jersey.  It is a 2 1/2-story, brick building with 1 1/2-story wings on either side, in the Victorian style.  It features an overhanging hipped and gable roof, with a large wooden cupola. Passenger service ceased in 1963, and the station closed in 1972.

It was added to the National Register of Historic Places in 1975.

The building is being renovated so that it can be occupied by Luzerne County’s tourism bureau.

Wilkes-Barre was served by another station that hosted Delaware and Hudson Railway, Lehigh Valley Railroad and Pennsylvania Railroad trains.

References

External links
Wilkes-Barre station

Buildings and structures in Wilkes-Barre, Pennsylvania
Railway stations in the United States opened in 1868
Railway stations on the National Register of Historic Places in Pennsylvania
Former Central Railroad of New Jersey stations
National Register of Historic Places in Luzerne County, Pennsylvania
Transportation buildings and structures in Luzerne County, Pennsylvania
Railway stations closed in 1963

Former railway stations in Pennsylvania